Platycarya is a genus of flowering plants in the family Juglandaceae native to eastern Asia in China, Korea, and Japan.

It is a deciduous tree growing to 15 m tall. The leaves are usually pinnate, 15–30 cm long with 7–15 leaflets (rarely simple, or with up to 23 leaflets), the terminal leaflet present; the leaflets are 3–11 cm long and 1.5–3.5 cm broad. The flowers are presented as catkins; the male (pollen) catkins are 2–15 cm long, the female catkins 2.5–5 cm long at maturity, hard and woody, superficially resembling a conifer cone with spirally arranged scales.

The genus was formerly treated as comprising a single species Platycarya strobilacea, though the second living species Platycarya longzhouensis is now recognized.
A number of fossil species have been discovered across the Northern Hemisphere dating from the Early Eocene, although they became confined to eastern Asia during the Pleistocene ice ages.
†Platycarya americana 
†Platycarya bognorensis 
†Platycarya castaneopsis 
†Platycarya manchesterii 
†Platycarya miocenica 
†Platycarya pseudobrauni 
†Platycarya richardsoni (sic P. richardsonii)

References 

Juglandoideae
Fagales genera
Flora of China
Flora of Japan
Flora of Korea